Magnolia is the tenth studio album by British alternative rock band The Pineapple Thief.

Track listing

Personnel 
Musicians

 Steve Kitch: Fender Rhodes, keyboards, Mellotron, piano
 Dan Osborne: Drums, percussion, backing vocals
 Bruce Soord: Vocals, guitar, keyboards, percussion
 Jon Sykes: Bass, backing vocals
 Darran Charles: Guitar
 Natalia Bonner: Violin
 Alison Dods: Violin
 Jonathan Evans-Jones: Violin
 Richard George: Violin
 Patrick Kiernan: Violin
 Steve Morris: Violin
 Everton Nelson: Violin
 Lucy Wilkins: Violin
 Reiad Chibah: Viola
 Rachel Robson: Viola
 Bruce White: Viola
 Ian Burdge: Cello
 Chris Worsey: Cello
 Mary Scully: Double bass
 Andrew Skeet: String arrangements, conductor

Production 

 Arranged by The Pineapple Thief
 Produced by Dan Osborne
 Additional Production by Steve Cole
 Engineered by Adam Noble and Marco Pasquariello

References

External links 

2014 albums
The Pineapple Thief albums
Kscope albums
Alternative rock albums by English artists